Ohio's 20th senatorial district is based in east-central Ohio. It used to stretch into southeastern Ohio.  It is made up of the counties of Fairfield, Hocking, Morgan, Muskingum and Guernsey as well as portions of Pickaway and Athens counties. It encompasses Ohio House of Representatives districts 77, 78 and 97.  It has a Cook PVI of R+5.  Its Ohio Senator is Republican Tim Schaffer.  He resides in Lancaster, a city located in Fairfield County.

List of senators

References

External links
Ohio's 20th district senator at the 130th Ohio General Assembly official website

Ohio State Senate districts